Cerreto may refer to:

Places

Croatia
Cerovlje (It.: Cerreto): municipality of the Istria County

Italy
Municipalities (comuni)
Abbadia Cerreto, Province of Lodi
Cerreto Abbey
Cerreto Castello, in the Province of Biella
Cerreto d'Asti, in the Province of Asti
Cerreto d'Esi, in the Province of Ancona 
Cerreto di Spoleto, in the Province of Perugia 
Cerreto Grue, in the Province of Alessandria 
Cerreto Guidi, in the Province of Florence 
Cerreto Langhe, in the Province of Cuneo 
Cerreto Laziale, in the Province of Rome
Cerreto Sannita, in the Province of Benevento

Civil parishes (frazioni)
Borgo Cerreto, in the municipality of Cerreto di Spoleto (PG)
Borgo Cerreto (Torre Orsaia), in the municipality of Torre Orsaia (SA)
Castel Cerreto, in the municipality of Treviglio (BG)
Cerreto (Bettona), in the municipality of Bettona (PG)
Cerreto, Sorano, in the municipality of Sorano (GR)
Cerreto (Rofrano), in the municipality of Rofrano (SA)
Cerreto (Vallerotonda), in the municipality of Vallerotonda (FR)
Cerreto Alpi, a former frazione of Ventasso (RE) 
Cerreto Laghi, in the municipality of Ventasso (RE)
Cerreto Selva, in the municipality of Sovicille (SI)

Personalities
Scipione Cerreto (1551–1633), Italian composer

See also
Cerrito (disambiguation)